John Leo Mann (February 4, 1898 – March 31, 1977) was an American Major League Baseball player who played for the Chicago White Sox in . He was used as a pinch hitter and a third baseman.

External links

1898 births
1977 deaths
Chicago White Sox players
Baseball players from Indiana
Asheville Tourists players
Atlanta Crackers players
Dallas Steers players
Evansville Evas players
Hartford Senators players
Jersey City Skeeters players
Macon Peaches players
New Haven Profs players
Okmulgee Drillers players
Providence Grays (minor league) players
Rochester Tribe players
Springfield Ponies players
Wichita Falls Spudders players